Hristo Turlakov (born 20 March 1979) is a Bulgarian former competitive figure skater. Competing as a single skater, he appeared at six European Championships. His highest placement was 21st in 2003. 

Turlakov also competed as a pair skater on the junior level, placing 19th at the 1998 World Junior Championships with Irina Mladenova, and 23rd at the 1999 World Junior Championships with Anna Dimova.

Programs

Results
GP = Grand Prix; JGP = Junior Series (Junior Grand Prix)

Men's singles

Pairs with Mladenova and Dimova

References

External links
 

Bulgarian male single skaters
Bulgarian pair skaters
1979 births
Figure skaters from Sofia
Living people